Hypselostoma perigyra is a species of very small air-breathing land snail, a terrestrial pulmonate gastropod mollusk in the family Vertiginidae, the whorl snails.

Distribution 
The distribution of Hypselostoma perigyra includes an area near Bukit Takun, Selangor, in Peninsular Malaysia''.

References

Vertiginidae
Invertebrates of Malaysia
Gastropods described in 1950